Martina E. Vandenberg (born ) is an American lawyer, activist, and nonprofit executive. She is the founder and president of the Human Trafficking Legal Center, a nonprofit that trains pro bono lawyers to seek restitution for human trafficking victims.

Early life and education
Vandenberg grew up in Gilroy, California. She attended Pomona College, where she studied international relations and was president of the student body. After graduating in 1990, she earned a masters degree in Russian/East European studies from Oxford University as a Rhodes Scholar. In 1992, at the age of 24, she moved to Russia and founded the country's first rape crisis center. She became a Truman Scholar in 1998, and earned a J.D. from Columbia Law School.

Career
Vandenberg was a researcher for Human Rights Watch, for which she authored two reports, "Hopes Betrayed: Trafficking of Women and Girls to Post-Conflict Bosnia & Herzegovina for Forced Prostitution" and "Kosovo: Rape as a Weapon of 'Ethnic Cleansing.'"

She was also a partner at Jenner & Block LLP, where she focused on commercial litigation and investigations of companies that illegally bribed foreign governments to advance their business interests.

In 2012, she founded the Human Trafficking Legal Center with support from the Open Society Foundations. The center is a nonprofit that trains pro bono lawyers to seek restitution for victims of human trafficking. , she has trained more than 4000 attorneys.

Recognition
In 2020, she was the commencement speaker at Pomona, and was awarded an honorary doctorate.

References

External links
Biography page at the Human Trafficking Legal Center
Interview on labor trafficking with Stephen Marks

21st-century American women lawyers
21st-century American lawyers
Activists from California
21st-century American businesswomen
21st-century American businesspeople
Living people
1960s births
Pomona College alumni
American Rhodes Scholars
Alumni of the University of Oxford
Columbia Law School alumni
People from Gilroy, California
American nonprofit executives